Camp Sibert was a U.S. Army chemical weapons training facility in Etowah County, Alabama, and St. Clair County, Alabama, during the World War II era. Covering 32,000 acres, it was acquired by the Army in 1942. The site has been redeveloped, including with a residential community. Concerns over chemical contamination and unexploded ordnance remain.

The camp was commanded by General Haig Shekerjian, an Armenian-American. Private A. Baligian of the U.S. Army visited Camp Sibert and conducted a brief interview with Shekerjian for the June 16, 1943, issue of Hairenik Weekly (later renamed the Armenian Weekly).

Further reading
This is Camp Sibert Alabama "Chemical Warfare Service", 32 pages, including photographs (1944)

Referencesnced

Chemical warfare facilities
1942 establishments in Alabama
Buildings and structures in Etowah County, Alabama
Buildings and structures in St. Clair County, Alabama